Because Cyprus has no working railway system, various other methods of transport are  needed to ensure the proper delivery of any cargo, be it human or freight. Since the last railway was dismantled in 1952, the only remaining modes of transport are by road, by sea, and by air.

Roads 

Of the 12,118 km of roads in the areas controlled by the Republic of Cyprus in 2006, 7,850 km were paved, while 4,268 km were unpaved. In 1996, the Turkish Cypriot area showed a close, but smaller ratio of paved to unpaved with about 1,370 km out of 2,350 km paved and 980 km unpaved. As a legacy of British rule, Cyprus is one of only three EU nations in which vehicles drive on the left.

Motorways

 A1 Nicosia to Limassol
 A2 connects A1 near Pera Chorio with A3 by Larnaca
 A3 Larnaca Airport to Agia Napa, also serves as a circular road for Larnaca.
 A5 connects A1 near Kofinou with A3 by Larnaca
 A6 Pafos to Limassol
 A7 Pafos to Polis (final plans)
 A9 Nicosia to Astromeritis
 A22 Dali industrial area to Anthoupolis, Lakatamia (Nicosia 3rd ring road, final plans)

Public buses
In 2006, extensive plans were announced to improve and expand bus services and restructure public transport throughout Cyprus, with the financial backing of the European Union Development Bank. In 2010, the new revised and expanded bus network was implemented into the system.

The bus system is numbered:

 1 - 33                      Limassol daytime local routes
 40 - 95A                    Limassol daytime rural routes
 100 - 259                   Nicosia daytime buses
 300s                        Nicosia night network route
 101/102/201/301/ 500s       Famagusta/Ayia Napa district daytime route
 400s                        Larnaca area route
 600s                        Paphos area routes
 700s                        Larnaca - Famagusta/Ayia Napa area routes
 N (prevex routes)           Limassol night buses network

Some bus routes are:
 30  Le Meridien Hotel 1 - MY MALL    up to every 10 minutes
 101 Ayia Napa Waterpark - Paralimni                       up to every 15 minutes
 610 Pafos Harbour Station - Market                        up to every 10 minutes
 611 Pafos Harbour Station - Waterpark                     up to every 10 minutes
 615 Pafos Harbour Station - Coral bay                     up to every 10 minutes
 618 Pafos Harbour Station - Pafos karavella bus station   Every 30 mins (Mon - Sat daytime)

Public transportation 
Nicosia's residents rely on private cars to go around the city. With more than 629 automobiles per 1,000 people, Cyprus has one of the highest car ownership rates in the world, yet the country uses very little green transportation. Only 3% of journeys in the Greater Nicosia urban region are made by public transportation. Cycling is considerably less common—2%. The government of Cyprus and authorities of Nicosia are developing a public transportation plan to ensure access to more areas and provide more options, apart from private cars.

Licensed vehicles

Road transport is the dominant form of transport on the island. Figures released by the International Road Federation in 2007 show that Cyprus holds the highest car ownership rate in the world with 742 cars per 1,000 people.

Public transport in Cyprus is limited to privately run bus services (except in Nicosia), taxis, and interurban 'shared' taxi services (locally referred to as service taxis). Thus, private car ownership in the country is the fifth highest per capita in the world. However, in 2006 extensive plans were announced to expand and improve bus services and restructure public transport throughout Cyprus, with the financial backing of the European Union Development Bank

Ports and harbours 

The ports of Cyprus are operated and maintained by the Cyprus Ports Authority. Major harbours of the island are Limassol Harbour, and Larnaca Harbour, which service cargo, passenger, and cruise ships. Limassol is the larger of the two, and handles a large volume of both cargo and cruise vessels. Larnaca is primarily a cargo port but played a big part in the evacuation of foreign nationals from Lebanon in 2006, and in the subsequent humanitarian aid effort. A smaller cargo dock also exists at Vasilikos, near Zygi (a small town between Larnaca and Limassol). Smaller vessels and private yachts can dock at Marinas in Cyprus.

Larnaca Marina in Larnaca

St Raphael Marina in Limassol

Paphos Harbour

List of ports and harbours: Larnaca, Limassol, Paphos, Vasilikos.

Public Bicycle sharing system

Bike in Action is the latest transportation system for the greater Nicosia area, similar to programs employed successfully in various cities around the world (Paris, Barcelona, Amsterdam, Melbourne, etc.). Bicycles can be found at stations in all participating municipalities (Agios Dometios, Aglandjia, Dali, Engomi, Latsia, Pallouriotissa, Strovolos) and returned after their use at any station.

Merchant marine 

See full article on Cyprus Merchant Marine
total:

ships by type:
barge carrier 2, bulk carrier 442, cargo ship 495, chemical tanker 22, combination bulk 40, combination ore/oil 8, container ship 144, Liquified Gas Carrier 6, passenger ship 8, petroleum tanker 142, refrigerated cargo 41, roll-on/roll-off 45, short-sea passenger 13, specialized tanker 4, vehicle carrier 2 (1999 est.)

Airports 

In 1999, Cyprus had 12 airports with paved runways. Of them, seven had runways of lengths between 2,438 and 3,047 metres, one had a length between 1,524 and 2,437 metres, three had lengths between 914 and 1524 metres, and one had a length less than 914 metres.

Of the three airports with unpaved runways, two had lengths less than 914 metres and one had a length between 914 and 1524 metres.

In 1999, Cyprus had six heliports and two international airports: Larnaca International Airport and Paphos International Airport. Nicosia International Airport has been closed since 1974.

References

External links